Creedence Clearwater Revival, also abbreviated as CCR, was an American rock band formed in El Cerrito, California. The band initially consisted of lead vocalist, lead guitarist, and primary songwriter John Fogerty; his brother, rhythm guitarist Tom Fogerty; bassist Stu Cook; and drummer Doug Clifford. These members had played together since 1959, first as the Blue Velvets and later as the Golliwogs, before settling on Creedence Clearwater Revival in 1967. The band's most prolific and successful period between 1969 and 1971 produced fourteen consecutive top 10 singles (many of which were double A-sides) and five consecutive top 10 albums in the United States – two of which, Green River (1969) and Cosmo's Factory (1970), reached number one. The band performed at the 1969 Woodstock festival in Upstate New York, and was the first major act signed to appear there.

CCR disbanded acrimoniously in late 1972 after four years of chart-topping success. Tom Fogerty had left the previous year, and John was at odds with the remaining members over matters of business and artistic control, all of which resulted in lawsuits among the former bandmates. Fogerty's disagreements with Fantasy Records owner Saul Zaentz led to more court cases and John Fogerty refused to perform with the two other surviving members at Creedence's 1993 induction into the Rock and Roll Hall of Fame. Though the band has never officially reunited, John Fogerty continues to perform CCR songs as part of his solo act, while Cook and Clifford have performed as Creedence Clearwater Revisited since the 1990s.

CCR's music remains a staple of U.S. classic rock radio airplay; 28 million CCR records have been sold in the U.S. alone. The compilation album Chronicle: The 20 Greatest Hits, originally released in 1976, is still on the Billboard 200 album chart and reached the 600-weeks mark in August 2022. It has been awarded 10× platinum.

History

Early career: The Blue Velvets (1959–1964)
John Fogerty, Doug Clifford, and Stu Cook met at Portola Junior High School in El Cerrito, California. Calling themselves the Blue Velvets, the trio played instrumentals and "jukebox standards", and backed John's older brother Tom at recordings and performances before he joined the band. The band had also released three singles, the second of which was picked up by Casey Kasem, who worked at KEWB, Oakland. In 1964 they signed with Fantasy Records, an independent jazz label in San Francisco. The band was attracted to the label after hearing a recording by Vince Guaraldi called "Cast Your Fate to the Wind" which the label had released to national success.

Vision and the Golliwogs (1964–1967)
For the band's first release, Fantasy co-owner Max Weiss renamed the group The Golliwogs (after the children's literary character Golliwog). Prior to the Golliwog name, Weiss had renamed them to Vision. Bandmembers' roles changed during this period: Cook switched from piano to bass guitar and Tom Fogerty from lead vocals to rhythm guitar; John became the band's lead vocalist and primary songwriter. In Tom's words: "I could sing, but John had a sound!"

In 1966, John Fogerty and Doug Clifford were  drafted into the U.S. armed forces; Fogerty joined the U.S. Army Reserve while Clifford joined the U.S. Coast Guard Reserve. Speaking of his experience in the US Army Fogerty has said: "I would become delirious and go into a trance. And I started narrating this story to myself, which was the song 'Porterville'." John Fogerty eventually took control of the group by singing lead vocals, and blossoming into a multi-instrumentalist who played keyboards, harmonica, and saxophone in addition to lead guitar. By 1967, he was producing the group's recordings.

Name change to Creedence Clearwater Revival (1967–1969)

In 1967, Saul Zaentz bought Fantasy Records and offered the band a chance to record a full-length album. Having hated the name "The Golliwogs" from day one, the band decided on their own name, Creedence Clearwater Revival (CCR), which they took in January 1968. According to interviews with band members twenty years later, the name's elements came from three sources: Tom Fogerty's friend Credence Newball, whose name they changed to form the word Creedence (as in creed);  a television commercial for Olympia Brewing Company ("clear water"); and the four members' renewed commitment to their band. Rejected contenders for the band's name included "Muddy Rabbit", "Gossamer Wump", and "Creedence Nuball and the Ruby"; however, the last was the starting point from which the band derived their final name. Cook described the name as "weirder than Buffalo Springfield or Jefferson Airplane". In early 1968, the band began appearing regularly at local San Francisco area clubs and venues including Deno and Carlo's, the Avalon Ballroom, and the Fillmore West. Later that year, the band began touring nationally across the US and made their first appearances in New York City at the Fillmore East.

By 1968, AM radio programmers around the U.S. took note when CCR's cover of the 1956 rockabilly song "Susie Q" received substantial airplay in the San Francisco Bay Area and on Chicago's WLS-AM. It was the band's second single, its first to reach the Top 40 (No. 11), and its only Top 40 hit not written by John Fogerty. Two other singles were released from their May 1968 debut self titled album: a cover of Screamin' Jay Hawkins's "I Put a Spell on You" (No. 58) and "Porterville" (released on the Scorpio label with writing credited to "T. Spicebush Swallowtail"), written during Fogerty's time in the Army Reserve.

Peak success: 1969–1970 

After their breakthrough, CCR began touring and started work on their second album, Bayou Country (released January 1969), at RCA Studios in Los Angeles. A No. 7 platinum hit, the record was their first in a string of hit albums and singles that continued uninterrupted for two years. The single "Proud Mary", backed with "Born on the Bayou", reached No. 2 on the national Billboard chart. The former would eventually become the group's most-covered song, with some 100 versions by other artists to date, including the No. 4 1971 hit by Ike & Tina Turner, two years to the week after the original peaked. John cites this song as being the result of high spirits on gaining his discharge from the Army Reserve. The album also featured a remake of the rock & roll classic "Good Golly, Miss Molly" and the band's nine-minute live-show closer, "Keep On Chooglin'".

Months later, during April 1969, "Bad Moon Rising" backed with "Lodi", was released and peaked at No. 2 in the US. In the United Kingdom, "Bad Moon Rising" spent three weeks at number one on the UK Singles Chart during September and October 1969, becoming the band's only number one single in the UK. The band's third album, Green River, followed in August 1969, was their first album to top the Billboard 200, and went gold along with the single "Green River", which again reached No. 2 on the Billboard charts. The B-side of "Green River", "Commotion", peaked at No. 30 and the band's emphasis on remakes of their old favorites continued with "Night Time Is the Right Time". CCR continued to tour constantly with performances in July 1969 at the Atlanta Pop Festival and in August 1969 at the Woodstock Festival. Their set was not included in the Woodstock film or soundtrack because John felt the band's performance was subpar. Four tracks from the event (out of a total of eleven) were eventually included in the 1994 commemorative box set Woodstock: Three Days of Peace and Music. Cook, however, held an opposing view, saying, "The performances are classic CCR and I'm still amazed by the number of people who don't even know we were one of the headliners at Woodstock '69." John later complained the act that preceded them, the Grateful Dead, had put the audience to sleep; as John scanned the audience he saw a "Dante scene, just bodies from hell, all intertwined and asleep, covered with mud".

After Woodstock, CCR were busy honing material for a fourth album, Willy and the Poor Boys, their second top 3 LP, released in November 1969. "Down on the Corner" and "Fortunate Son", both of which they performed on The Ed Sullivan Show on November 16, 1969, climbed to No. 3 and No. 14, respectively, by year's end.  The album was CCR in standard mode, featuring Fogerty originals and two reworked Lead Belly covers, "Cotton Fields" and "Midnight Special".  The year 1969 had been a remarkable chart year for the band:  three Top Ten albums, four hit singles (charting at No. 2, No. 2, No. 2, and No. 3) with three additional charting B-sides.

CCR released another double A-side hit, "Travelin' Band"/"Who'll Stop the Rain", in January 1970. The speedy "Travelin' Band", with a strong Little Richard sound, however, bore enough similarities to "Good Golly, Miss Molly" to warrant a lawsuit by the song's publisher; it was eventually settled out of court. The song ultimately topped out at No. 2. The band also recorded its January 31, 1970, live performance at the Oakland Coliseum Arena, which would later be marketed as a live album and television special. In February, CCR were featured on the cover of Rolling Stone, although only John was interviewed in the accompanying article.

In April 1970, CCR were set to begin their first European tour. To support the upcoming live dates, John wrote "Up Around the Bend" and "Run Through the Jungle"; the single reached No. 4 that spring. The band returned to Wally Heider Studios in San Francisco in June to record Cosmo's Factory. The album contained the earlier Top 10 hits "Travelin' Band" and "Up Around the Bend" plus popular album tracks such as the opener "Ramble Tamble".

Cosmo's Factory was released in July 1970, and it was number one in the US for nine weeks. It was released along with the band's fifth and final No. 2 national hit, "Lookin' Out My Back Door"/"Long as I Can See the Light". Although they topped some international charts and local radio countdowns, CCR have the distinction of having had five No. 2 singles without ever having had a No. 1 on the Hot 100, the most of any group. Their five No. 2 singles were exceeded only by Madonna, Taylor Swift, and Drake with six each, and tied with Elvis Presley and the Carpenters.  Conversely, on station WLS-AM the band had three No. 1's, four No. 3's, and two No. 4's, but no No. 2 singles, with "Down on the Corner" the only top ten CCR single registering the same peak position (No. 3) on the Hot 100 and on WLS.

Other cuts on the Cosmo's Factory album included an 11-minute jam of the 1968 Marvin Gaye "I Heard It Through the Grapevine" (a minor hit when an edited version was released as a single in 1976), and a nearly note-for-note homage to Roy Orbison's "Ooby Dooby". The album was their biggest seller and went to No. 1 on the Billboard 200 album charts and No. 11 on Billboard's Soul Albums chart.

Pendulum, released in December 1970, was another top seller, spawning a Top 10 hit with "Have You Ever Seen The Rain?" John included Hammond B3 Organ on many of the Pendulum tracks, notably "Have You Ever Seen The Rain?", in recognition of the deep respect and influence of Booker T. & the M.G.'s, with whom the members of the band had jammed. The single's flip side, "Hey Tonight", was also a hit.

Tom Fogerty's departure, discord, and breakup: 1971–1972 

Around this time, an overwhelming perception among other band members that John was being overly controlling and domineering within the group was approaching a boiling point. Tom Fogerty decided he had enough and resigned from CCR in early 1971 after the recording of Pendulum; his departure was made public the following February. At first, the remaining members considered replacing him but ultimately continued as a trio.

In the spring of 1971, John Fogerty, frustrated with his remaining bandmates' constant complaining that they were not allowed to write and produce their own songs, did an about-face and informed Cook and Clifford that CCR would continue only by adopting a "democratic" approach: each member would now write and perform his own material, with each band member contributing three songs apiece to the next album. Fogerty would only contribute guitar parts to his bandmates' songs.

There are conflicting views regarding Cook and Clifford's reaction to this proposed new arrangement, though all parties seem to acknowledge that Cook and Clifford had wanted more input in CCR's artistic and business decisions.  For his part, Fogerty recounts that Cook and Clifford were initially excited about this new opportunity to write and perform their own songs free of his meddling, as they had been the ones who asked for it in the first place, and that they only soured on the concept after the record's lack of success (although, Fogerty also mentions a time while recording the album when he refused Cook's request to "fix" one of his (Cook's) songs to make it sound more like other Creedence material, which may have also played a role in the band members' attitudes toward the project).  However, other sources imply that Cook and Clifford were resistant to this approach from the start. Allegedly, Fogerty at one point insisted they accept the arrangement or he would quit the band. Despite the conflict, the trio put its new work ethic to the test in the studio, releasing the Top 10 single "Sweet Hitch-Hiker" in July 1971, backed with Cook's "Door To Door". The band toured both the U.S. and Europe that Summer and Autumn, with Cook's song a part of the live set. In spite of their continuing commercial success, however, relations among the three had become increasingly strained.

The band's final album, Mardi Gras, was released in April 1972, featuring songs written by John Fogerty, Cook, and Clifford, as well as a cover of "Hello Mary Lou" (a song Gene Pitney had originally written for Ricky Nelson). Each member sang lead vocal on the songs written by that member. The album was a critical failure, considered by critics to be of inconsistent quality and lacking in cohesion. Rolling Stone reviewer Jon Landau deemed it "the worst album I have ever heard from a major rock band". The sales of Mardi Gras were weaker than previous albums, ultimately peaking at No. 12, though it still became the band's seventh consecutive studio album to be certified Gold. Fogerty's "Someday Never Comes", backed with Clifford's "Tearin' Up the Country", also cracked the U.S. Top 40.

By this point, Fogerty was not only at direct odds with his bandmates, but he had also come to see the group's relationship with Fantasy Records as onerous, feeling that Zaentz had reneged on his promise to give the band a better contract. Cook—who held a degree in business—claimed that because of poor judgment on Fogerty's part, CCR had to abide by the worst record deal of any major U.S. recording artist. Despite the relatively poor reception of Mardi Gras and deteriorated relationships among the remaining band members, CCR embarked upon a two-month, 20-date U.S. tour. However, on October 16, 1972—less than six months after the tour ended—Fantasy Records and the band officially announced its disbanding. CCR never formally reunited after the breakup, although Cook and Clifford eventually started the band Creedence Clearwater Revisited. John Fogerty later commented on the demise of CCR in a 1997 edition of the Swedish magazine Pop:

Post-breakup

John Fogerty

In 1973, John Fogerty began his solo career with The Blue Ridge Rangers, his one-man band collection of country and gospel songs. Under his old CCR contract, however, Fogerty owed Fantasy eight more records. In the end, he refused to work for the label. The impasse was resolved only when Asylum Records' David Geffen bought Fogerty's contract for $1 million. In 1975 he released his only Asylum album, the self-titled John Fogerty. His next major hit was Centerfield, a chart-topping success in 1985. On tour in 1986, however, Fogerty suffered complaints over his steadfast refusal to perform CCR songs and suffered with recurring vocal problems which he blamed on having to testify in court. Fogerty's explanation for not playing CCR material was that he would have had to pay performance royalties to copyright holder Zaentz, and that it was "too painful" to revisit the music of his past.

With the Centerfield album, Fogerty also found himself entangled in new, tit-for-tat lawsuits with Zaentz over the song "The Old Man Down The Road" which was, according to Zaentz, a blatant re-write of Fogerty's own 1970 CCR hit "Run Through the Jungle". Since Fogerty had traded his rights to CCR's songs in 1980 to cancel his remaining contractual obligations, Fantasy now owned the rights to "Run Through the Jungle" and sued Fogerty essentially for plagiarizing himself. While a jury ruled in Fogerty's favor, he did settle a defamation suit filed by Zaentz over the songs "Mr. Greed" and "Zanz Kant Danz". Fogerty was forced to edit the recording, changing the "Zanz" reference to "Vanz".

On February 19, 1987, at the Palomino Club (North Hollywood) in Los Angeles, Fogerty broke his self-imposed ban on performing CCR hits. Bob Dylan and George Harrison (along with Taj Mahal and Jesse Ed Davis) had joined him onstage, admonishing, "If you don't, the whole world's gonna think 'Proud Mary' is Tina Turner's song." At a 1987 Independence Day benefit concert for Vietnam veterans, Fogerty finally ran through the list of CCR hits, beginning with "Born on the Bayou" and ending with "Proud Mary". In 1986 he also released his second Warner Bros. album, Eye of the Zombie. Fogerty retreated from music again in the late 1980s but returned in 1997 with the Grammy-winning Blue Moon Swamp. Fogerty still tours frequently and now does perform CCR classics alongside solo material.

Tom Fogerty
Tom Fogerty released several solo albums, though none reached the success of CCR. His 1974 solo album Zephyr National was the last to feature the four original CCR band members. Several tracks sound very much like the CCR style, particularly the aptly titled "Joyful Resurrection" on which all four members played, even though John Fogerty recorded his part separately. His album Excalibur featured all four members of The Jerry Garcia Band (who recorded live albums for Fantasy)... Garcia played lead guitar to Tom's rhythm guitar, and has since become a popular cult album.   

Tom Fogerty died at his home in Scottsdale, Arizona, in September 1990 of an AIDS complication, which he contracted via a tainted blood transfusion he received while undergoing back surgery. Tom and John barely reconciled before Tom's death, and in the eulogy that he delivered at Tom's funeral, John said, "We wanted to grow up and be musicians. I guess we achieved half of that, becoming rock 'n roll stars. We didn't necessarily grow up".

Stu Cook and Doug Clifford

Junior high school friends Doug Clifford and Stu Cook continued to work together following the demise of CCR both as session players and members of the Don Harrison Band. They also founded Factory Productions, a mobile recording service in the Bay Area. Clifford released a solo record, Cosmo, in 1972. Cook produced artist Roky Erickson's The Evil One and was a bassist with the popular country act Southern Pacific in the 1980s.

Clifford also produced Groovers Paradise for former Sir Douglas Quintet and Texas Tornados frontman Doug Sahm. Both Clifford and Cook played on the album which was released on Warner Bros. in 1974. Clifford continued to perform and record with Sahm through the 1980s.

Following a relatively long period of musical inactivity, Cook and Clifford formed Creedence Clearwater Revisited in 1995 with several well-known musicians. Revisited continues to tour globally performing the original band's classics. John's 1997 injunction forced Creedence Clearwater Revisited to temporarily change its name to "Cosmo's Factory", but the courts later ruled in Cook's and Clifford's favor.

Fantasy Records
After CCR, Fantasy Records released several greatest-hits packages such as 1972's Creedence Gold, 1973's More Creedence Gold and 1975's Pre-Creedence, a compilation album of the Golliwogs' early recordings. Fantasy also released the highly successful double album Chronicle, a collection of Creedence's twenty hit singles, in 1976. Several years later, the label released a live recording entitled The Royal Albert Hall Concert. Contrary to its title, the 1970 performance was recorded in Oakland, California, not at the Royal Albert Hall in London. Subsequent issues of the original 1981 album have been retitled simply The Concert. Another double album of their best material was issued in 1986 as Chronicle: Volume Two.

The success of CCR made Fantasy and Zaentz a great deal of money, and Fantasy built a new headquarters building in 1971 at 2600 Tenth Street in Berkeley, California. Zaentz also used his wealth to produce a number of successful films, including Best Picture Oscar winners One Flew Over the Cuckoo's Nest, Amadeus, and The English Patient. In 2004, he sold Fantasy to Concord Records. As a goodwill gesture,  Concord honored the unfulfilled contractual promises Fantasy made nearly forty years earlier, finally paying CCR a higher royalty rate on their sales and restoring John's ownership of his songs.

John, seeing that Zaentz was no longer involved with the company, also signed a new contract with Concord/Fantasy. In 2005, the label released The Long Road Home, a collection of CCR and Fogerty solo classics. After Revival came out on the Fantasy label in October 2007 but before his following album Blue Ridge Rangers Rides Again (a sequel to his 1973 album) was issued in 2009, Fogerty switched from Fantasy to his own label, Fortunate Son Records, distributed by Verve Forecast Records.

Reunions 
The original CCR lineup rarely reunited after their breakup. All four members are present on Tom's 1974 album Myopia, and later at his wedding on October 19, 1980. John, Cook, and Clifford played at their 20th El Cerrito High School reunion in 1983, but as their original incarnation, the Blue Velvets. In the 1980s and 1990s, new rounds of lawsuits between the band members, as well as against their former management, deepened their animosities. By the time CCR was inducted into the Rock and Roll Hall of Fame in 1993, John refused to perform with Cook and Clifford. The pair were barred from the stage, while John played with an all-star band that included Bruce Springsteen and Robbie Robertson. Tom's widow Tricia had expected a CCR reunion and even brought the urn containing her husband's ashes to the ceremony. Furious, Cook and Clifford, who were seated with their families at a table across the room from Fogerty's, walked out of the ballroom just as the performance began, and would later write separate letters to the Rock and Roll Hall of Fame's board of directors, saying it was "hurtful" and "insulting" to allow the performance to continue without them.

In a July 2011 interview with the Calgary Herald, John admitted that he would at least be willing to consider reuniting with Cook and Clifford:

When asked again in October 2011 about the prospect of a reunion, he said: "I'm saying it's possible, yeah. I think the call [laughs] would maybe have to come from outside the realm. Somebody would have to get me to look at things in a fresh way." However, Cook and Clifford both stated in the February 2012 edition of Uncut magazine that they are not interested in a CCR reunion. "Leopards don't change their spots. This is just an image-polishing exercise by John. My phone certainly hasn't rung", Cook said. Added Clifford: "It might have been a nice idea twenty years ago, but it's too late."

In May 2013, Fogerty once again said he would be open to a reunion, but he does not see Cook and Clifford being willing to change their stance. He told Charlie Rose on CBS This Morning: "From time to time, I'll say something and it'll get in print that maybe that will happen, and then immediately I'll hear back stuff that doesn't sound like it's possible. ... I think it's a possibility in the future, you know. It's not something I'm actively seeking, but I'm not totally against the idea either." In September 2017 Clifford again ruled out any chance of Cook and himself reuniting with John, restating, "It would have been great twenty, twenty-five years ago. It's way too late now."

Musical style 

Despite hailing from California, CCR "mythologized the American South with an exotic mixture of blues, New Orleans R&B and rockabilly," according to NPR. According to AllMusic, CCR "created a unique synthesis of punchy rock & roll, swamp pop, blues, and country." CCR has been cited as pioneers of swamp rock and country rock. The band also played roots rock, blues rock and Southern rock. The band often utilized lyrics about bayous, catfish, the Mississippi River and other elements of Southern United States iconography. The band's songs rarely dealt with romantic love, concentrating instead on political and socially conscious lyrics about topics such as the Vietnam War.

Legal rights

CCR's catalog of songs has frequently been used or referenced in popular culture, partly because John Fogerty signed away legal control of his old recordings to the band's record label, Fantasy Records. In an NPR interview, Fogerty objected to what he regarded as a misuse of his music:

Of particular interest was the use of his protest song "Fortunate Son" in a blue jeans commercial. In this case, the advertiser eventually stopped using the song, as Fogerty related in a later interview:

Legacy

Rolling Stone ranked CCR 82nd on its 100 Greatest Artists of All Time. 
In 2003, Rolling Stones 500 Greatest Albums of All Time list included Green River at number 95,  Cosmo's Factory at number 265, and Willy and the Poor Boys at number 392. And in 2004, on their 500 Greatest Songs of All Time list, Rolling Stone included "Fortunate Son" at number 99, "Proud Mary" at number 155, "Who'll Stop the Rain" at number 188, and "Bad Moon Rising" at number 355.

According to Acclaimed Music, they are the 61st most celebrated artist in popular music history.

"Fortunate Son" was added to the Library of Congress' National Recording Registry list of sound recordings that "are culturally, historically, or aesthetically important" in 2013.

"Fortunate Son", "Proud Mary", and Cosmo's Factory have all been inducted into the Grammy Hall of Fame. "Proud Mary" is ranked at number 39 on VH1's "100 Greatest Rock Songs" list. "Bad Moon Rising" is ranked at number 363 on NME's "500 Greatest Songs of All Time" list.

Members
 Doug Clifford – drums, percussion, backing and occasional lead vocals (1959–1972)
 Stu Cook – bass guitar, backing and occasional lead vocals, keyboards (1959–1972)
 John Fogerty – lead vocals, lead guitar, keyboards, harmonica, saxophone (1959–1972)
 Tom Fogerty – rhythm guitar, backing and lead vocals (1959–1971; died 1990)

The Blue Velvets discography

The Golliwogs discography

Following its release as the A-side of the last Golliwogs single, this track was re-released, in January 1968, as the A-side of the first single credited to Creedence Clearwater Revival.  In July 1968, it was included on Creedence Clearwater Revival's first album.
Following its release as the B-side of the last Golliwogs single, this track was re-released, in January 1968, as the B-side of the first single credited to Creedence Clearwater Revival.CCR discography

Studio albums
 Creedence Clearwater Revival (1968)
 Bayou Country (1969)
 Green River (1969)
 Willy and the Poor Boys (1969)
 Cosmo's Factory (1970)
 Pendulum (1970)
 Mardi Gras (1972)

See also
The Golliwogs discography
John Fogerty discography
Tom Fogerty discographyCosmo''

References

External links

 Creedence Clearwater Revisited official site
 Creedence Clearwater Revival, The Ed Sullivan Show
 
 Creedence Clearwater Revival at WorldMusicDatabase
 
 Pop Chronicles Interviews #41 - John Fogerty and Creedence Clearwater Revival
 Creedence Clearwater Revival - The History

 
1967 establishments in California
1972 disestablishments in California
American blues rock musical groups
American country rock groups
American musical trios
American southern rock musical groups
Fantasy Records artists
Musical groups established in 1967
Musical groups disestablished in 1972
Musical groups from the San Francisco Bay Area
Musical quartets
People from El Cerrito, California
Rock music groups from California
Roots rock music groups
Sibling musical groups
Swamp rock groups